The Post Eagles are composed of 22 teams representing Post University  in intercollegiate athletics, including men and women's basketball, cross country, golf, ice hockey, lacrosse, soccer, tennis, and track and field. Men's sports include baseball and football. Women's sports include softball and volleyball. The Eagles compete in the NCAA Division II in 18 of their 22 sports, and are members of the Central Atlantic Collegiate Conference. The exceptions are women's ice hockey, in which the Eagles compete at the NCAA National Collegiate level (Divisions I and II) in the New England Women's Hockey Alliance, men’s ice hockey Northeast 10 and men’s and women’s indoor track East Coast Conference 
Beginning in the fall of 2020 Post University will begin sponsoring Men’s and Women’s Rugby and they will compete in the New England Wide Collegiate Rugby Conference NEWCRC.

Teams

Championships 
Past CACC championship teams.

Men's basketball
 CACC champion (2003)
 CACC Regular Season Champions (2021)
Men's golf
 3 individual tournament wins in the last 2 seasons
 (5×) CACC champion 2006–2010
 (12x) NCAA Regional appearances 2005-2013, 2016, 2018, 2019
 NCAA National Championship appearance 2012
 (2x) GCCA Academic National Championship 2012–2013
Men's soccer
 CACC champion 2008, 2018, 2019, 2021
 (4x) CACC regular-season champions 2011-2013, 2021
 (2x) ECAC champions 2014, 2015
 NCAA Regionals 2012, 2013, 2018, 2019 (Sweet 16), 2021
Men's track and field
 Individual CACC Champions - 100m, 2014; 800m, 2015
Men's Tennis
 NCAA Regional appearance 2017

Women's Soccer
 ECAC Champion 2015
Softball
 CACC Champion 2003
Women’s Cross Country
 CACC Individual Champ 2016, 2017, 2018
 NCAA Individual East Region Champ 2018, NCAA East Region Runner-Up 2017
 NCAA Individual Qualifier 2018, 2019
Women's Track and Field
 Individual CACC Champions - 100m, 2014; 100m and 200m, 2015
Women's volleyball
 (2×) CACC champion 2014, 2015
 (3×) NCAA Regional appearances 2014, 2015, 2016

Non-varsity programs
Non-varsity programs include cheerleading, and equestrian sports (IDA dressage, IHSA hunt seat, and IHSA western).

References

External links
 

Post University